The Southeast Pacific Area was one of the designated area commands created by the Combined Chiefs of Staff in the Pacific region during World War II. It was responsible to the Joint Chiefs of Staff via the Commander-in-Chief of the United States Navy (COMINCH), Admiral Ernest King. Rear Admiral Abel T. Bidwell, former commander of Cruiser Division Three, commanded the Southeast Pacific Area during the first months of the war.

History
On 24 March 1942, the newly formed British and Combined Chiefs of Staff issued a directive designating the Pacific theater an area of American strategic responsibility. Six days later the Joint Chiefs of Staff (JCS) divided the Pacific theater into three areas: the Pacific Ocean Areas (POA), the Southwest Pacific Area (SWPA), and the Southeast Pacific Area.

The Southeast Pacific Force, SoEastPac, was a small force of cruisers and destroyers based at Balboa, Panama which formed the main force operating in the Southeast Pacific Area. The Southeast Pacific Force was formed by a directive of 28 August 1941 to Admiral Husband Kimmel:

Amongst ships assigned to the Southeast Pacific Force were the light cruisers USS Concord, USS Trenton, USS Detroit, and the destroyers USS Warrington and USS McDougal.

Commanders 
The Official Chronology of the U.S. Navy in World War II dates the establishment of the Southeast Pacific Area to 8 December 1941.

Rear Admiral Abel T. Bidwell:   8 December 1941 – 6 January 1942
Rear Admiral John F. Shafroth Jr.:   6 January 1942 – 25 December 1942
Rear Admiral Francis E. M. Whiting:   25 December 1942 – 12 October 1943
Rear Admiral Harold C. Train:   12 October 1943 – 8 June 1944
Captain Ellis S. Stone (A):   8 June 1944 – 3 November 1944
Rear Admiral Howard F. Kingman:   3 November 1944 – 9 July 1945
Captain Schuyler Mills (A):   9 July 1945 – 23 August 1945
Rear Admiral John R. Beardall:   23 August 1945 – 2 September 1945

See also
 Panama during World War II

References

Pacific theatre of World War II
Allied commands of World War II
Military history of Panama during World War II